This is a list of some major Trade Unions in Pakistan

Major Confederation
Pakistan Workers Confederation
Pakistan Labour organization 
Major Federations''

Pakistan Transport & General Workers' Federation
All Pakistan Trade Union Federation
Pakistan Workers' Federation
Pakistan Labour Federation
All Pakistan Federation of Labour
All Pakistan Federation of Trade Unions
All Pakistan Federation of United Trade Unions
All Pakistan Trade Union Congress
Pakistan National Federation of Trade Unions
All Pakistan Oil & Gas Employees Federation (APOGEF)
Pakistan Trade Union Defence Campaign (PTUDC)
National labour FederatMajor Unions'''
Railway Worker's Union (Open Lines)
Railway Worker's Union (Workshops)

 
Labour movement in Pakistan
Pakistan
Trade unions